Microstomini is a tribe of fish in the Pleuronectinae subfamily.

Nomenclature

The word Microstomini is derived from the Greek μικρὸς (mikros), meaning "small", and στόμα (stoma), meaning "mouth".

Genera

 Dexistes
 Embassichthys
 Glyptocephalus
 Hypsopsetta
 Lepidopsetta
 Microstomus
 Pleuronichthys
 Tanakius

References 

Pleuronectidae
Fish tribes